Rogério Carvalho (born 28 May 1980) is a Brazilian former footballer who played as a striker.

Career
Carvalho joined English Third Division York City from Ituano in August 2002 after impressing during pre-season, becoming the first Brazilian player to play for the club. He spent a month on loan at Northern Premier League side Harrogate Town and was released by York in January 2003.

References

External links

1980 births
Living people
Brazilian footballers
Brazilian expatriate footballers
Association football forwards
Ituano FC players
York City F.C. players
Harrogate Town A.F.C. players
English Football League players
Northern Premier League players
Expatriate footballers in England
Brazilian expatriate sportspeople in England